Joseph Jacques Hughes Laperrière (born November 22, 1941) is a Canadian professional ice hockey coach and former player. Laperrière played for the Montreal Canadiens in the National Hockey League (NHL) from 1962 until 1974, winning six Stanley Cups on his way to induction in the Hall of Fame. As a coach, he was a member of two Stanley Cup-winning staffs. He is the father of NHL hockey player Daniel Laperrière and of major junior hockey coach Martin Laperrière.

Playing career
Born in Béarn, Quebec, Laperrière grew up idolizing the Montreal Canadiens. Defenceman Doug Harvey was Laperriere's favourite player as they both played defence. Laperrière spent his junior career with the Hull-Ottawa Canadiens, the Montreal Junior Canadiens and the Brockville Jr. Canadiens before making the jump to the National Hockey League in 1962–63 with the Montreal Canadiens. Laperriere played six games in the regular season and five more in the playoffs against the Toronto Maple Leafs in his first year in the NHL.

The next season saw Laperrière earn a full-time spot on the roster. His rookie season saw him play in 65 games while recording 30 points and 102 PIM. Laperrière also made few defensive errors. At season's end, the NHL awarded Laperrière the Calder Memorial Trophy for top rookie in the NHL, beating out teammate John Ferguson. Adding to that, Laperrière was selected to play in the 1964 NHL All-Star Game and he was also named to the NHL second All-Star team as a defenceman. This was the first time a rookie had earned a spot on the NHL All-Star team since World War II.

In 1964–65 season, Laperrière had another stellar season as he was named to the NHL first All-Star team in only his second season in the NHL. He also won the Stanley Cup as the Canadiens defeated the Chicago Black Hawks in seven games. The following season Laperrière was plagued with injuries. He only played 57 games but he was still awarded the James Norris Memorial Trophy for best defenceman in the league, and he was also selected to the NHL first All-Star team for the second year in a row. The Canadiens would also win the Stanley Cup that year, defeating the Detroit Red Wings. Laperrière did not participate in the post-season due to injuries.

Laperrière would play eight more seasons with the Canadiens, winning four more Stanley Cups. In 1972–73, Laperrière led the league in Plus-minus being the only player other than Bobby Orr to lead the league in that statistic between 1969 and 1975. He would retire halfway through the 1973–74 season due to a career-ending knee injury.

He was inducted into the Hockey Hall of Fame in 1987.

Coaching career
After retiring, Laperrière became the coach of the Montreal Juniors in 1975–76. He would resign the following year due to his distaste of the pressure and violence at the amateur level. In 1980–81, Laperrière rejoined the Canadiens organization as an assistant coach to Claude Ruel. He would stay as the Canadiens assistant coach for 16 years, serving under six different head coaches, and winning two Stanley Cups in 1985–86 and in 1992–93. In 1997–98, Laperrière joined the Boston Bruins staff, serving under Pat Burns as an assistant coach again. He spent four seasons in Boston before joining the New York Islanders in 2001–02. After two seasons with the Islanders, Laperrière became a part of the New Jersey Devils organization in 2003–04. Once again, Laperriere served as an assistant coach until 2006–07 when he was named a special assignment coach for the Devils.

Awards and achievements
 Calder Memorial Trophy — 1964
 NHL second All-Star team — 1964, 1970
 NHL All-Star Games — 1964, 1965, 1967, 1968, 1970
 Stanley Cup champion — 1965, 1966, 1968, 1969, 1971, 1973 (as a player) (Montreal)
 NHL first All-Star team — 1965, 1966
 James Norris Memorial Trophy — 1966
 NHL Plus/Minus leader — 1973
 Stanley Cup champion — 1986, 1993 (as an assistant coach) (Montreal)
 Inducted into Hockey Hall of Fame in 1987

Career statistics

Regular season and playoffs

* Stanley Cup Champion.

References

External links

1941 births
Boston Bruins coaches
Calder Trophy winners
Canadian ice hockey defencemen
French Quebecers
Hockey Hall of Fame inductees
Sportspeople from Rouyn-Noranda
Ice hockey people from Quebec
James Norris Memorial Trophy winners
Living people
Montreal Canadiens coaches
Montreal Canadiens players
Montreal Junior Canadiens players
Montreal Juniors coaches
New Jersey Devils coaches
New York Islanders coaches
Stanley Cup champions
Canadian ice hockey coaches